Wang Xinbo(born 24 January 1988 in Qingdao), former name Wang Weilong ( before 10 August 2012) is a former Chinese professional footballer.

Club career
While Wang Weilong began his football career by playing for the various Shandong Luneng youth squads for several seasons where he was never able make any senior level appearance for Shandong Luneng senior team. He transferred to Jiangsu Sainty in 2008 and was awarded the No.20 jersey. In the second tier he would go on to establish himself as a regular within the team and in his debut season he would help guide the club to win the division championship and promotion to the top tier of Chinese football.

He moved to fellow top tier club Nanchang Hengyuan in 2011 and would make his competitive debut on April 9, 2011 in a league game against Guangzhou Evergrande F.C. that ended in a 1-1 draw. After one season with Nanchang Hengyuan, Wang joined second tier club Shenzhen Ruby at the beginning of the 2012 league season on a three-year contract. After establishing himself as a regular for the club over the next several season Wang was allowed to join another second division team, Meizhou Hakka on loan for the 2018 league season.

National team
Wang would be part of the Chinese under-17 national team that won the 2004 AFC U-17 Championship where he scored the winner in the final against North Korea. After that tournament China would qualify for the 2005 FIFA U-17 World Championship and Wang would also be included in that squad which reached the quarter-finals after being knocked out by Turkey.

Career statistics
Statistics accurate as of match played 31 December 2020.

Honours

Club
Jiangsu Sainty
China League One: 2008

International
China U-17
 AFC U-17 Championship: 2004

References

External links
Player stats at Sohu.com
 

1988 births
Living people
Chinese footballers
Footballers from Qingdao
Jiangsu F.C. players
Shanghai Shenxin F.C. players
Shandong Taishan F.C. players
Shenzhen F.C. players
Meizhou Hakka F.C. players
Liaoning Shenyang Urban F.C. players
Chinese Super League players
China League One players
Association football defenders